The 2018 Six Nations Championship (known as the Natwest 6 Nations for sponsorship reasons) was the 19th Six Nations Championship, the annual international rugby union tournament for the six major European rugby union nations.

The championship was contested by France, Ireland, Italy, Scotland, Wales and defending champions England. Including the competition's previous iterations as the Home Nations Championship and Five Nations Championship, it was the 124th edition of the tournament.

The Championship was won by Ireland on 10 March 2018, with their four wins (three with try bonus points) from the first four matches sufficient to place them out of reach of the other participants ahead of the final round. This was the third tournament running where the championship and Wooden Spoon had been decided by the end of round four. After a 24–15 victory against England on the final day, Ireland secured a Grand Slam, their third ever, alongside a Triple Crown.

Participants

1 Dylan Hartley was ruled out of round 4 due to injury, and Owen Farrell captained England in his absence.
2 Alun Wyn Jones was dropped from the match-day team to play Italy in round 4, and Taulupe Faletau captained Wales in his absence.
3 Guilhem Guirado was ruled out of round 5 due to injury, and Mathieu Bastareaud captained France in his absence.

Squads

Table

 Table ranking rules
 Four match points are awarded for a win.
 Two match points are awarded for a draw.
 A bonus match point is awarded to a team that scores four or more tries in a match or loses a match by seven points or fewer. If a team scores four tries in a match and loses by seven points or fewer, they are awarded both bonus points.
 Three bonus match points are awarded to a team that wins all five of their matches (known as a Grand Slam). This ensures that a Grand Slam winning team always ranks over a team who won four matches in which they also were awarded four try bonus points and were also awarded two bonus points in the match that they lost.
 Tiebreakers –
 If two or more teams be tied on match points, the team with the better points difference (points scored less points conceded) is ranked higher.
 If the above tiebreaker fails to separate tied teams, the team that scored the higher number of total tries in their matches is ranked higher.
 If two or more teams remain tied for first place at the end of the championship after applying the above tiebreakers, the title is shared between them.

Fixtures
The fixtures were announced on 16 May 2017. France hosted games in more than one venue, with their Friday night game against Italy taking place at the Stade Vélodrome, Marseille.

Round 1

Notes:
 Josh Adams (Wales) and Murray McCallum (Scotland) made their international debuts.	
 This was Wales' first try bonus point in the Six Nations.

Notes:
 Matthieu Jalibert, Geoffrey Palis, Adrien Pélissié, Dany Priso, Cedate Gomes Sa and Marco Tauleigne (all France) made their international debuts.	

Notes:
 Alessandro Zanni (Italy) became the seventh Italian international to earn his 100th test cap.
 Alec Hepburn (England) made his international debut.

Round 2

Notes:
 Jordan Larmour (Ireland) made his international debut.	
This was Ireland's 300th Test win.

Notes:
 With this win, England won their 15th consecutive Six Nations home game, breaking their previous record of 14 between 1998–2003.	
 Leigh Halfpenny was originally named in the starting XV but fell ill the night before the match. Gareth Anscombe replaced him in the starting XV, and centre Owen Watkin came onto the bench.
 This was the lowest aggregate score in a Six Nations match since England beat Ireland 12–6 in 2013.

Notes:
 Scotland claim the first ever Auld Alliance Trophy.

Round 3

Notes:
 Baptiste Couilloud (France) made his international debut.
 France retain the Giuseppe Garibaldi Trophy.

Notes:
 This was Warren Gatland's 100th test match in charge of Wales.

Notes:
 Blair Kinghorn (Scotland) made his international debut.
 Joe Launchbury (England) earned his 50th test cap.
 This was Scotland's first victory over England since 2008.
 Scotland reclaimed the Calcutta Cup for the first time since 2008.
 Huw Jones' first try was Scotland's first scored against England in Edinburgh since Simon Danielli in 2004.
 Scotland extended their home winning record in the Six Nations to 6 games, their best ever run in the Six Nations. 
 This was Scotland's largest victory over England in the Six Nations, and their biggest since they won 33–6 in 1986. That match was also the last time that Scotland had scored three tries against England at Murrayfield.

Round 4

Notes:
 Ireland reclaim the Centenary Quaich.

Notes:
 With this English loss, Ireland claimed the Championship with the final round yet to be played.
 This was the first time since 2015 that England lost two consecutive games; 2015 was also the last time France beat England.
 This was the first time since 2010 England lost multiple games in a single Six Nations tournament.
 With Dylan Hartley's injury, Owen Farrell captained England for the first time.

Notes:
 James Davies (Wales) made his international debut.
 Samson Lee was named on the bench, but withdrew from the squad due to illness on match-day. He was replaced with Rhodri Jones.
 Wales's win guaranteed Italy would win the "wooden spoon" for coming last.

Round 5

Notes:
 Jake Polledri (Italy) made his international debut.
 Tommaso Benvenuti (Italy) earned his 50th test cap.
 The losing bonus point obtained by Italy was their first point under the new points structure introduced in 2017.
 This loss was Sergio Parisse's 100th test loss, the first time the figure has been reached.

Notes:
 Marius van der Westhuizen was originally named as a touch judge, but was replaced with Nigel Owens by World Rugby, after attending an England training session in midweek.
 England's defeat was their first loss at Twickenham in the Six Nations since 2012 (a run of 15 matches), their first loss at home overall since 2015 (a run of 14 games), and Ireland's first win against England at Twickenham since 2010.
 Ireland retained the Millennium Trophy for the first time since their three consecutive victories over England between 2009 and 2011.
 Ireland won their third Grand Slam and their eleventh Triple Crown; the first time they had won either since 2009.	
 Rob Kearney and Rory Best share the distinction of being Ireland's only players to have won multiple Grand Slams, having both played in the 2009 Six Nations.
 With this win, Ireland became the first team to earn the three-point bonus for completing a Grand Slam.

Notes:
 Mathieu Babillot (France) made his international debut.	
 The losing bonus point secured by France ensured that England finished 5th outright for the first time since 1983.

Statistics

Top points scorers

Top try scorers

Notes

References

External links
Official website

 
2018 rugby union tournaments for national teams
2018
2017–18 in European rugby union
2017–18 in Irish rugby union
2017–18 in English rugby union
2017–18 in Welsh rugby union
2017–18 in Scottish rugby union
2017–18 in French rugby union
2017–18 in Italian rugby union
February 2018 sports events in France
February 2018 sports events in Italy
February 2018 sports events in the United Kingdom
February 2018 sports events in Europe
March 2018 sports events in France
March 2018 sports events in the United Kingdom
March 2018 sports events in Italy
NatWest Group